The United Methodist Church of the Highlands, originally First Presbyterian Church of Highland Falls, is a historic church located on Main Street in Highland Falls, New York designed by notable Gothic Revival architect Frederick Clarke Withers.

It was the first church founded in the village. In 1982 it was listed on the National Register of Historic Places, along with other properties in the Hudson Highlands.

Building

The church is located on the west side of Main Street in downtown Highland Falls, north of Tobin Lane. Across Main and the West Point Highway is the large complex around the United States Military Academy's Thayer Hotel and the parking lot for the West Point Museum. Another church, Sacred Heart, is to the north, with its school to the west. A residential area is to the south.

The building itself is a three-bay blue granite structure with a steep gabled nave.  On the east (front) facade is a narthex with an engaged bell tower on the southern end. It is topped with a steeply pitched slate roof, with a corbeled cornice and lancet windows below. The main entrance, a pair of heavy wooden doors in the center of the narthex, is framed by recessed columns with foliated capitals. On a projecting pediment above is a carved datestone.

There is a single casement window in the narthex to the north of the door. Above the narthex, in the nave's gable field, is a large round window. The side elevations of the building have six pairs of lancet windows, separated by wall buttresses.

History

The church was founded by five residents who met at first in a building on Mill Street in 1830. It was the first church established in Highland Falls. By 1867 the parish was large enough to erect its own church.

The half-acre (2,000 m²) site was acquired from the estate of W.B. Cozzens. A design was commissioned from the firm of Wycliff and Baldwin, but it was never used. Instead money from the lecture tours of Edward Payson Roe, the pastor at the time who later became a popular novelist, and donations from friends helped the church commission and build the Withers design. John Bigelow, former ambassador to France and a summer resident of the village, attended the dedication ceremony.

See also
Hudson Highlands Multiple Resource Area
National Register of Historic Places listings in Orange County, New York

References

External links

United Methodist Church of the Highlands

Former Presbyterian churches in New York (state)
United Methodist churches in New York (state)
Churches on the National Register of Historic Places in New York (state)
National Register of Historic Places in Orange County, New York
Romanesque Revival church buildings in New York (state)
Religious organizations established in 1830
Churches completed in 1868
19th-century Presbyterian church buildings in the United States
Highland Falls, New York
Churches in Orange County, New York
1830 establishments in New York (state)
Frederick Clarke Withers buildings